Cotton Eyed Joe is a live album by Karen Dalton recorded in October 1962, but not released until 2007, in 2×CD + DVD format.

At the time Dalton, her husband, and daughter lived in a shack in the Colorado mountains, without electricity or running water, and she would occasionally play at the Attic, a folk club in Boulder, Colorado. The album is a recording of a performance there, made by the club's co-proprietor and a friend of Dalton's, Joe Loop.

Track listing
CD 1
 "It's All Right" (Ray Charles) – 5:45
 "Everytime I Think of Freedom" (Traditional) – 3:03
 "Cotton-Eyed Joe" (Traditional) – 4:31
 "Pastures of Plenty" (Woody Guthrie) – 3:52
 "One May Morning" (Traditional) – 4:17
 "Red Are the Flowers" (Fred Neil) – 5:31
 "Blues On the Ceiling" (Fred Neil) – 3:20 
 "Run Tell That Major" (Traditional) – 3:22 
 "Down and Out" (Jimmy Cox) – 3:43 
 "Fannin' Street" (Huddie Ledbetter) – 2:33 
CD 2
 "In The Evening" (Leroy Carr) – 5:10 
 "Old Hannah" (Traditional) – 3:27 
 "Pallet On Your Floor" (Jelly Roll Morton) – 3:38 
 "Prettiest Train" (Traditional, Lomax Prison Recordings) – 4:10 
 "Mole in the Ground" (Traditional) – 5:48 
 "Darlin' Corey" (Traditional) – 4:42 
 "It Hurts Me Too" (Mel London) – 4:12 
 "Katie Cruel" (Traditional) – 2:34 
 "Blackjack" (Ray Charles) – 3:12 
 "No More Taters" (Traditional) – 4:57 
 "Good Morning Blues" (Huddie Ledbetter) – 3:36 
DVD
 "God Bless the Child" (Billie Holiday, Arthur Herzog, Jr.)
 "It Hurts Me Too" (Mel London)
 "Little Bit of Rain" (Fred Neil)
 "Blues Jumped The Rabbit" (Traditional)

Personnel
 Karen Dalton - vocals, 12-string guitar, banjo
Technical
 Joe Loop - recording

References

 

Karen Dalton (singer) albums
2007 live albums